Urodan (Urodaan) is a rural locality (a selo), and one of two settlements in Berezovsky National Nomadic Rural Okrug of Srednekolymsky District in the Sakha Republic, Russia, in addition to Berezovka, the administrative center of the Rural Okrug. Its population as of the 2010 Census was 8; down from 25 recorded during the 2002 Census.

References

Notes

Sources
Official website of the Sakha Republic. Registry of the Administrative-Territorial Divisions of the Sakha Republic. Srednekolymsky District. 

Rural localities in Srednekolymsky District